Liffey Sound FM is a not-for-profit community radio station broadcasting to the suburban town of Lucan, County Dublin and its environs, broadcasting on the frequency 96.4 MHz. The station is operated by Liffey Sound Communications Co-Operative Society Limited. The station broadcasts under a sound broadcasting contract from the Broadcasting Authority of Ireland. Liffey Sound FM is a member of CRAOL, the Community Radio Forum of Ireland.

Liffey Sound participate annually in the Lucan Festival, streaming live and commentating on the events.

History 
In 2002 Liffey Sound Communications Co-Operative Society Limited was registered with the Irish Office of the Registrar of Friendly Societies. On 11 July 2006 the Broadcasting Commission of Ireland signed a five-year community radio contract with Liffey Sound Communications Co-Operative Society Limited with the radio station commencing broadcasting that month. The station was officially opened on 6 October by the then Italian Ambassador to Ireland, Lugio Albertio Savoria. Liffey Sound FM first broadcast over the weekends with a schedule of 23 hours per week. Since then the station has increased broadcasting hours and now broadcast for a total of 58 hours weekly. In June 2011 Liffey Sound Communications Co-Operative Society Limited secured an extension to the Broadcasting Licence for a further 3 years.

References

External links 
 Official Website

Mass media in Dublin (city)
Community radio stations in Ireland
Radio stations in the Republic of Ireland
Radio stations established in 2006